Dmitri Zakharov may refer to:

 Dmitri Zakharov (footballer, born 1971), Russian football player
 Dmitri Zakharov (footballer, born 2000), Russian football player